Sevier County is a county of the U.S. state of Tennessee. As of the 2020 census, the population was 98,380. Its county seat and largest city is Sevierville. Sevier County comprises the Sevierville, TN Micropolitan Statistical Area, which is included in the Knoxville-Morristown-Sevierville, TN Combined Statistical Area.

History
Prior to the arrival of white settlers in present-day Sevier County in the mid-18th century, the area had been inhabited for as many as 20,000 years by nomadic and semi-nomadic Native Americans.  In the mid-16th century, Spanish expeditions led by Hernando de Soto (1540) and Juan Pardo (1567) passed through what is now Sevier County, reporting that the region was part of the domain of Chiaha, a minor Muskogean chiefdom centered around a village located on a now-submerged island just upstream from modern Douglas Dam.  By the late 17th-century, however, the Cherokee, whose ancestors were living in the mountains at the time of the Spaniards' visit, had become the dominant tribe in the region. Although they used the region primarily as hunting grounds, the Chicakamauga faction of the Cherokee vehemently fought white settlement in their territory, frequently leading raids on households, even through the signing of various peace treaties, alternating short periods of peace with violent hostility, until forcibly marched from their territory by the U.S. government on the "Trail of Tears".

Sevier County was formed on September 18, 1794, from part of neighboring Jefferson County, and has retained its original boundaries ever since. The county takes its name from John Sevier, governor of the failed State of Franklin and first governor of Tennessee, who played a prominent role during the early years of settlement in the region. Since its establishment in 1795, the county seat has been situated at Sevierville (also named for Sevier), the eighth-oldest city in Tennessee.

Sevier County was strongly pro-Union during the Civil War.  When Tennessee held a vote on the state's Ordinance of Secession on June 8, 1861, Sevier Countians voted 1,528 to 60 in favor of remaining in the Union.  In November 1861, William C. Pickens, Sheriff of Sevier County, led a failed attempt to destroy the railroad bridge at Strawberry Plains as part of the East Tennessee bridge-burning conspiracy.

Prior to the late 1930s, Sevier County's population, economy, and society, which relied primarily on subsistence agriculture, held little significance vis-à-vis any other county in the rural South. However, with the creation of the Great Smoky Mountains National Park in the early 1930s, the future of Sevier County (within which lies thirty percent of the total area of the national park) changed drastically. Today, tourism supports the county's economy.

Geography

The southern part of Sevier County is located within the Great Smoky Mountains, and is protected by the Great Smoky Mountains National Park. The northern parts of the county are located within the Ridge-and-Valley Appalachians. Sevier contains the highest point in Tennessee, Clingmans Dome, which rises to  along the county's border with North Carolina. The  Mount Le Conte, a very prominent mountain visible from much of the central part of the county, is the state's third-highest.

Sevier County is drained primarily by the French Broad River, which passes through the northern part of the county. A portion of the French Broad is part of Douglas Lake, an artificial reservoir created by Douglas Dam in the northeastern part of the county. The three forks of the Little Pigeon River (East, Middle, and West) flow northward from the Smokies, converge near Sevierville, and empty into the French Broad north of Sevierville. The West Fork is the best known, as it flows through the popular tourist areas of Gatlinburg and Pigeon Forge.

Adjacent counties
Jefferson County, Tennessee - north
Cocke County, Tennessee - east
Haywood County, North Carolina - southeast
Swain County, North Carolina - south
Blount County, Tennessee - west
Knox County, Tennessee - northwest

National protected areas
 Appalachian Trail (part)
 Foothills Parkway (part)
 Great Smoky Mountains National Park (part)

State protected area
 Roundtop Mountain State Natural Area

Demographics

2020 census

As of the 2020 United States census, there were 98,380 people, 37,933 households, and 26,538 families residing in the county.

2010 census
As of the census of 2010, there were 89,889 people, 37,583 households, and a homeownership rate of 68.7 percent, below the state average. The racial makeup of the county was 95.80% White, 0.86% Asian, 0.80% Black or African American, 0.19% Native American, 0.02% Pacific Islander, 1.02% from other races, and 1.31% from two or more races. 5.33% of the population were Hispanic or Latino of any race.

There were 28,467 households, out of which 30.70% had children under the age of 18 living with them, 59.30% were married couples living together, 10.10% had a female householder with no husband present, and 26.80% were non-families. 22.00% of all households were made up of individuals, and 7.90% had someone living alone who was 65 years of age or older. The average household size was 2.48 and the average family size was 2.88.

In the county, the population was spread out, with 23.00% under the age of 18, 8.30% from 18 to 24, 29.80% from 25 to 44, 26.30% from 45 to 64, and 12.60% who were 65 years of age or older. The median age was 38 years. For every 100 females there were 95.90 males. For every 100 females age 18 and over, there were 92.20 males.

The median income for a household in the county was $34,719, and the median income for a family was $40,474. Males had a median income of $27,139 versus $20,646 for females. The per capita income for the county was $18,064. About 8.20% of families and 10.70% of the population were below the poverty line, including 13.10% of those under age 18 and 10.10% of those age 65 or over.

Sevier County was Tennessee's third fastest-growing county by percentage change in population between the 1990 census and 2000 census.

Government
The head of the Sevier County government, the county mayor (known as county executive until 2003), is elected in county-wide elections. The mayor serves along with a 25-member board of elected commissioners representing districts covering the many small communities spread across the county.

Presidential elections

Sevier County, like most of East Tennessee, votes strongly Republican in Presidential elections. The last election in which a Republican failed to carry it was in 1912, when the Progressive Theodore Roosevelt carried it. It has not been carried by a Democrat since 1832, when it went for Andrew Jackson. In 1916 it gave Charles Hughes 90.38 percent of the vote—reportedly his highest percentage of any county in the nation. In 1932 Herbert Hoover received 77.01% of the vote and in 1936 Alf Landon received 77.73%. Since 1916 no Republican candidate has received less than 55% of the county's vote and in 2008 John McCain received 73.4%.  All of the county's state legislators are Republicans, and Republican candidates routinely garner well over 70 percent of the vote on the occasions they face opposition at all.

At local elections, the county is similarly Republican. However, the county backed Senator Al Gore in 1990 and Governor Phil Bredesen in 2006 in landslides.

Economy

From its beginnings as a traditional subsistence-based farming society, Sevier County has grown into a major tourist destination since the establishment of the Great Smoky Mountains National Park, which dominates the southern portion of the county. One of the very reasons for the park's creation, however, was also one of the county's first major economic engines: the lumber industry. Establishments in what is now the national park felled large amounts of timber in the early 1900s. Though the park effectively killed the logging industry in the late 1930s, it spurred the development of one of the largest tourist resorts in the United States of America, as the Great Smoky Mountains National Park is now the most visited national park in the country.  In recent years the tourism bubble has expanded beyond the city of Gatlinburg, which borders the northwestern segment of the national park, and into the nearby cities of Pigeon Forge and Sevierville. Sevier County now has the third largest tourism economy in Tennessee, ranking behind Nashville and Memphis, the state's two largest cities.

The commercial cabin rental industry has grown tremendously in recent years.

Tourist attractions
The tourism industry drives the county's economy. The following destinations are among the most lucrative for the area:

Great Smoky Mountains National Park, southern Sevier County: Established in 1936 and propelling the tourism industry in Sevier County ever since, the national park is the most visited in the entire system, welcoming over 10 million nature enthusiasts every year, most of whom arrive through Sevier County.
Dollywood, Pigeon Forge: The theme park named for part-owner Dolly Parton (who was born in Locust Ridge) admits nearly 3 million guests a year, making it both the most popular theme park and most frequented attraction (after the Great Smoky Mountains National Park) in Tennessee.
Ripley's Aquarium of the Smokies, Gatlinburg: Opened in 2000 and designated the most visited aquarium in the United States in 2001, when over 2 million tourists passed through its galleries, Ripley's Aquarium of the Smokies is the largest single tourist draw in Gatlinburg.
Ober Gatlinburg, Gatlinburg: The Ober Gatlinburg ski resort sits above Gatlinburg, offering numerous attractions for visitors unique to the county, including winter ski slopes and an indoor ice skating rink. The tramway that takes visitors to and from the resort is touted as "America's Largest Aerial Tramway."
Smoky Mountain Opry, Pigeon Forge: A musical revue stage show that debuted in 2011. It offers both that program during the majority of the year, as well as the "Christmas Spectacular" during the winter months.
Foxfire Mountain Themed Adventure Park, Sevierville: A 150-acre wilderness theme park located in the foothills of the Great Smoky Mountains offers a wide range of outdoor adventures including: zip lining, ATV tours, climbing walls, free-fall jumps, aerial adventure courses, hiking trails and the longest swinging bridge in the United States.
TopJump Trampoline & Extreme Arena, Pigeon Forge: a trampoline park located at the foot of the Great Smoky Mountains National Park offers a safe and extreme adventure for people of all ages. Considered Pigeon Forge's top Indoor Attraction, TopJump offers 21 Cliffhanger climbing challenges, a Boneyard Stunt Tower, AirStrike Dodgeball, Fire & Ice Ninja Course, a 5000 square foot arcade, a Hologate Virtual Reality gaming system.
Crave Golf Club, Pigeon Forge: features the only 19-hole indoor golf course in the Smokies, as well as a 19-hole Rooftop Course. Also contains a candy land theme and candy store. The course also features the only mini-bowling alley in Pigeon Forge and 2 state-of-the-art escape rooms. Is ranked Pigeon Forge's Best Mini-Golf & Ranked Top 13 Mini-Golf Courses in the Country.

Education
The Sevier County school system is composed of thirty-two public and private institutions ranging from Head Start programs through a number of secondary schools. In addition, two post-secondary institutions have campuses within the county.

Head Start:
Boyds Creek Headstart, on Boyds Creek Highway
Douglas Dam Headstart, in Sevierville
Harrisburg Headstart, on Old Harrisburg Road
Wearwood Headstart, in Sevierville
Underwood Headstart, in Kodak

Preschool:
Trula Lawson Early Childhood Center, in Sevierville

Elementary/middle schools:
Boyds Creek Elementary, in Sevierville
Caton's Chapel Elementary, on Caton's Chapel Road
Jones Cove Elementary, on Jones Cove Road
New Center School, in Sevierville
Northview Primary, in Kodak
Northview Intermediate, in Kodak
Pi Beta Phi Elementary, in Gatlinburg
Pigeon Forge Middle, in Pigeon Forge
Pigeon Forge Primary, in Pigeon Forge
Pittman Center School, in Pittman Center
Sevierville Intermediate, in Sevierville
Sevierville Middle, in Sevierville
Sevierville Primary, in Sevierville
Seymour Middle, Seymour
Seymour Intermediate, Seymour
Seymour Primary, Seymour
Wearwood Elementary, Sevierville

High schools:
Gatlinburg-Pittman High School, in Gatlinburg
  Northview Academy, in Kodak
Pigeon Forge High School, in Pigeon Forge
Sevier County High School, in Sevierville
Seymour High School, in Seymour
Vocational Center (at Sevier County High School), in Sevierville

Other schools:
Covenant Christian Academy, on Old Newport Highway
Day School, in Sevierville
King's Academy, in Seymour
My Audie's Place, in Pigeon Forge
New Hope Church of God, in Sevierville
Raggedy Andy's Playhouse Inc., in Sevierville

Colleges and universities
There are two post-secondary institutions in the county, both located in Sevierville. The first is a satellite campus of the Morristown-based Walters State Community College.  The second is a satellite campus of Johnson City-based East Tennessee State University.

Parks
In addition to the federally operated Great Smoky Mountains National Park, Sevier County is home to numerous smaller community parks, primarily within the cities of Sevierville, Pigeon Forge, and Gatlinburg. The most significant of them are listed as follows:

Holt Park (Gatlinburg)
Mills Park (Gatlinburg)
Mynatt Park (Gatlinburg)
Northview Optimist Park (Kodak)
Patriot Park (Pigeon Forge)
Pigeon Forge City Park
Sevierville City Park

Transportation
The massive development of the tourism industry in Sevier County in recent years, while blessing the county with good economic fortunes, has put a major stress on the county's roadways. In an effort to control this the county has put forth numerous projects to widen existing highways, and the cities of Pigeon Forge and Gatlinburg  have also implemented a bus service oriented towards visitors, which ferries tourists to and from various popular destinations throughout the towns via decorated buses referred to as "trolleys."

Highways

Interstate 40
U.S. Route 321
U.S. Route 411
U.S. Route 441
State Route 35
State Route 66
State Route 71
State Route 73
State Route 73 Scenic
State Route 139
State Route 338
State Route 339
State Route 416
State Route 448
State Route 449
State Route 454

The Great Smoky Mountains Parkway connects Interstate 40 (Exit 407) to the national park via the cities of Sevierville, Pigeon Forge, and Gatlinburg. From the exit, the Parkway follows Tennessee State Route 66 ("Winfield Dunn Parkway") into Sevierville, where it becomes U.S. Route 441/Tennessee State Route 71 as TN-66 terminates at a four-way intersection where US-441 splits from U.S. Route 411 and changes direction. It continues along US-441 through Pigeon Forge and Gatlinburg, before entering the national park, where it ascends to the crest of the Smokies at Newfound Gap and crosses into North Carolina (although by this time it is no longer known as the "Great Smoky Mountains Parkway"). The Parkway is joined U.S. Route 321 in Pigeon Forge and they run concurrently until US-321 splits away in downtown Gatlinburg. Along this stretch of U.S. and Tennessee highways, a nearly continuous tourist sprawl (separated only by a spur route of the Foothills Parkway, known as "the spur") has emerged in the three communities.

Airports

Gatlinburg-Pigeon Forge Airport (KGKT)

Communities
Sevier County, like much of rural Southern Appalachia, consists of relatively few incorporated municipalities and numerous unincorporated settlements.

Cities
Gatlinburg
Pigeon Forge
Sevierville (county seat)

Town
Pittman Center

Census-designated places
Fairgarden
Seymour (partial)

Unincorporated communities

Alder Branch
Beech Springs
Boyds Creek
 Catlettsburg
 Caton
Cherokee Hills
DuPont
Kodak
Locust Ridge
 Oldham
Reagantown
Richardson Cove
Shady Grove
Strawberry Plains (partial)
Wears Valley (census county division)

Notable people
Irene Baker (1901–1994), U.S. Congresswoman
 David Baker, Assistant District Attorney General for Greene County and participant in the January 6 United States Capitol attack
Reese Bowen Brabson (1817–1863), U.S. Congressman
Edwin Cunningham (1868-1953), United States Consul General in Shanghai, 1920-1935
Richard "Preacher Dick" Evans (1824–1901), Baptist preacher
Robert H. Hodsden (1806–1864), Southern Unionist and state legislator
Leonidas C. Houk (1836–1891), U.S. Congressman
Charles Inman (1810–1899), Southern Unionist and state legislator
John P. McCown (1815–1879), Confederate general
Bashful Brother Oswald (1911–2002), country musician and entertainer
Dolly Parton (born 1946), country music singer-songwriter, actress, philanthropist, author, businesswoman,  Ambassador To The Great Smoky Mountains
Randy Parton (1953-2021), country music singer-songwriter, actor, and businessman
Stella Parton (born 1949), country music singer-songwriter and businesswoman 
John Henninger Reagan (1818–1905), U.S. Senator and Confederate cabinet member
Benny Sims (1924–1994), bluegrass musician
William Stone (1791–1853), U.S. Congressman
John Tipton (1786–1839), U.S. Senator
Cas Walker (1902–1998), grocery store magnate and politician

In popular culture
Sevier County is the setting for the novels The Orchard Keeper and Child of God by Cormac McCarthy.
Gatlinburg was the site of the showdown between Sue and his father in the Johnny Cash hit, "A Boy Named Sue".
Country singer Ronnie Milsap's "Smoky Mountain Rain" refers to a truck driver taking the heartbroken narrator "as far as Gatlinburg" from Knoxville

See also

National Register of Historic Places listings in Sevier County, Tennessee

References

External links

Official site

Sevier county landforms

 
1794 establishments in the Southwest Territory
Counties of Appalachia
Populated places established in 1794
Second Amendment sanctuaries in Tennessee
East Tennessee